Bogdănița is a commune in Vaslui County, Western Moldavia, Romania. It is composed of seven villages: Bogdănița, Cârțibași, Cepești, Coroiești, Rădăești, Schitu and Tunsești.

References

Communes in Vaslui County
Localities in Western Moldavia